The Antiquarian Horological Society, abbreviated to AHS, is the UK-based learned society for scholars and enthusiasts of horology. Its administrative office is at 4 Lovat Lane, a listed building close to the Monument, in the City of London. In early 2016, the Society appointed Dr Patricia Fara of Clare College, Cambridge as its new president, following the untimely death of its previous president Professor Lisa Jardine. The Chairman is Dr James Nye.

The Society was founded in 1953. It unites collectors, scholars and museum professionals interested in the historical aspects of horology – the study of the art, science, social history and technology of timekeepers, such as clocks and watches.

The society is a registered charity under English law.

Activities
The principal meetings of the Society are held periodically, primarily in London. Meetings may also be multi-day seminars, held in a number of locations such as Oxford. The Society hosts a London Lecture Series, which from January 2020 has been held at St Mary-at-Hill, a Wren church opposite the Society's headquarters in Lovat Lane.  The annual general meeting is usually held at the National Maritime Museum and involves a one-day seminar. Once a year the organization usually organizes an international study tour, travelling to a foreign locale to study historic horological artefacts.

Besides the main body that meets in London, there also are numerous Sections, most of them regional groups of members spread throughout the United Kingdom, plus five international sections (Ireland, USA, Canada, Netherlands) and three special interest sections with interests in turret clocks, wristwatches and electrical horology. Sections may hold their own meetings and in some cases publish members' newsletters or organize horological study tours. The usual focus is on the presentation of papers on horological subjects. Some meetings involve visits to museums, restoration workshops or private collections.

Library
The Society maintains an horological library, which is functionally integrated with the library of the Worshipful Company of Clockmakers at Guildhall, London.

Publications
Antiquarian Horology & the Proceedings of the Antiquarian Horological Society, generally known as Antiquarian Horology, is the Society's quarterly academic journal, which is peer-reviewed and available to members, and to the public in a variety of public libraries.

The Society also publishes books on horological subjects, which are available to the public.

Affiliated organisations 
In 2012, the AHS formally affiliated with the Royal Astronomical Society.
In 2014, the AHS formally affiliated with the Worshipful Company of Clockmakers.
In 2016, the AHS formally affiliated with the Wales and Marches Horological Society

Sister organisations
Its main sister organizations in other countries pursuing similar goals are:

 Association Française des Amateurs d'Horlogerie Ancienne - AFAHA (France)
 Chronometrophilia (Switzerland)
 Deutsche Gesellschaft für Chronometrie - DGC (Germany)
 HORA Associazione Italiana Cultori di Orologeria Antica (Italy)
 National Association of Watch and Clock Collectors'' - NAWCC (United States of America)

References

Sources

External links
 Antiquarian Horological Society website

Horological organizations
Charities based in England
Organizations established in 1953
City of London